Assara korbi is a species of snout moth in the genus Assara. It was described by Aristide Caradja in 1910 and is known from eastern Asia, including Japan.

The wingspan is about 14 mm for males and 24 mm for females.

References

Phycitini
Moths described in 1910
Moths of Asia
Taxa named by Aristide Caradja